Andrew Todd Russell (born 27 April 1984, in Melbourne) is an Australian former professional baseball pitcher. He played for Team Australia in the 2013 World Baseball Classic.

References

External links

1984 births
Living people
Australian expatriate baseball players in the United States
Baseball pitchers
Gwinnett Braves players
Lynchburg Hillcats players
Mayos de Navojoa players
Melbourne Aces players
Mississippi Braves players
Sportspeople from Melbourne
Texarkana Bulldogs baseball players
2013 World Baseball Classic players
Australian expatriate baseball players in Mexico